Niter kibbeh, or niter qibe, also called  (in Tigrinya), is a seasoned, clarified butter used in Ethiopian and Eritrean cuisine.  Its preparation is similar to that of ghee, but niter kibbeh is simmered with spices such as besobela (known as Ethiopian sacred basil),  koseret, fenugreek, cumin, coriander, turmeric, Ethiopian cardamom (korarima), cinnamon, or nutmeg before straining, imparting a distinct, spicy aroma.  The version using  vegetable oil instead of butter is called yeqimem zeyet.

See also
 List of Ethiopian dishes and foods
 Kibbeh

References

External links
 Niter kibbeh recipe
 Authentic Niter Kibbeh (Ethiopian Spiced Clarified Butter) recipe

Butter
Tesmi
Ethiopian cuisine
Herb and spice mixtures